Lake Helena is a body of water along Prickly Pear Creek in the Helena Valley of Lewis and Clark County in southwestern Montana.

History
Completion of Hauser Dam on the Missouri River in 1907 created Hauser Lake. In addition, it created an arm of the lake, flooding  of Prickly Pear Creek and surrounding wetlands to form Lake Helena.

In 1945, a causeway was built to separate the lake from the flooded canyon portion of the old Prickly Pear Creek. The causeway replaced a 1904 combination steel and wood bridge.  The steel span was 120' long, and the overall length of the bridge was 520'. The concrete piers of the steel bridge, which was sold for scrap and dismantled in 1952, can still be seen just north of the causeway.

Water from Tenmile Creek, Prickly Pear Creek, Silver Creek, and the Helena Valley Irrigation Project flows into the west end of the lake. Lake Helena supported a commercial carp fishery for decades. The marshy west end of the lake is now a popular birding location.

External links
  Montana FWP fishing index for Lake Helena.

References

Helena
Bodies of water of Lewis and Clark County, Montana